In the theory of community of practice, an interdisciplinary field between sociology of education and educational psychology, the notion of a duality is used to capture the idea of the tension between two opposing forces which become a driving force for change and creativity. Wenger  uses the concept of dualities to examine the forces that create and sustain a community of practice. He describes a duality as "a single conceptual unit that is formed by two inseparable and mutually constitutive elements whose inherent tensions and complementarity give the concept richness and dynamism" .  

Some compare the concept of a duality to that of yin and yang, i.e. two mutually defining opposites.

The opposing entities in a duality need to be viewed from a perspective of balance rather than opposition. The term implies a dynamism, continual change and mutual adjustment as the tensions that are inherent in dualities can be both creative and constraining.  identifies four dualities that exist in communities of practice: participation–reification, designed–emergent, identification–negotiability and local–global.

Participation and reification 
The participation–reification duality is concerned with meaning. Meaning is created through participation and active involvement in some practice. Reification is a way of making an abstract and concise representation of what is often a complex and frequently messy practice, thus making it easier to share within the community. Because of its obvious links to knowledge management, the participation-reification duality has been the focus of particular interest in this field .

Designed and emergent 
The designed–emergent duality focuses on time and captures the tension between pre-planned and emergent activities. Designers can plan an activity that is designed to achieve a particular purpose however, some activities emerge through interaction and participation of the community; these are unplanned and may be contrary to what the designers intended. These give participants the opportunity to (re)negotiate existing meaning. The designed–emergent duality is often mentioned in relation to the design of on-line learning environments e.g. .

Identification and negotiability 
The identification–negotiability duality is concerned with "how the power to define, adapt, or interpret the design is distributed" . Identification is the process through which individuals build their identities. This can include not only how individuals perceive themselves but also their right to contribute to and shape the direction of a community as a whole. Thus, this duality serves to combine both power and belonging in the shaping of the community.

Local and global 
The local–global duality concerns how one CoP relates to another. The challenge is to share local knowledge that meets the needs of a particular domain in a way that will be of relevance to others who are not involved in it. Wenger uses the notion of a boundary object, brokerage  and boundary encounters  to explain how individuals can establish relationships and learn from other communities.

See also
 Force-field analysis
 Two-factor models of personality

Bibliography 
 
 
 
 
 
 

Knowledge management
Educational psychology
Emergence
Dichotomies